Peter or Pete Higgins may refer to:
 Pete B. Higgins (born 1957), American dentist and politician
 Pete Higgins (businessman), early Microsoft employee and investment capitalist
 Peter Higgins (athlete) (1928–1993), British sprinter
 Peter Higgins (footballer) (born 1966), Australian rules footballer